is a 3D fighting video game based on the visual novel Fate/stay night, released for the PlayStation Portable by Capcom and Cavia in cooperation with Type-Moon. The characters are all rendered in a super deformed style. A sequel, Fate/tiger colosseum Upper, was released on August 28, 2008.

Characters

Playable characters in the game include Archer, Rin Tōsaka, Shirō Emiya, Sakura Matō, Saber, and Taiga Fujimura.

All characters from the Fate/stay night series, as well as the main characters of Fate/hollow ataraxia, Bazett Fraga McRemitz and Caren Ortensia, make an appearance as playable characters.

A bonus character was also seen as a new addition to the roster of characters. That character was revealed as Saber dressed in a lion costume (to represent her favorite animal) wielding a piece of meat. In the trailers all she says is "Gao Gao Gao!"—the Japanese onomatopoeia for a roar.

tiger colosseum 
Taiga Fujimura
Saber
Shirō Emiya
Archer
Rin Tōsaka
Sakura Matō
Dark Sakura
Lancer
Rider
Caster
Berserker
Assassin
Illyasviel von Einzbern
Shinji Matō
Sōichirō Kuzuki
True Assassin
Saber Alter
Gilgamesh
Kirei Kotomine
Bazett Fraga Mcremitz (from hollow ataraxia)
Caren Ortensia (from hollow ataraxia)
Saber Lion
Lion costume form of Saber.

tiger colosseum Upper 
Kiritsugu Emiya
Irisviel von Einzbern
Avenger (from hollow ataraxia)
Neco-Arc (from Tsukihime)
Deutragonist of tiger colosseum Upper.
Phantas-Moon
Ruby-chan/Magical-Amber
Magical-Caren
A Magical girl form of Caren in Paper bag head and antagonist of tiger colosseum Upper.
Kaleido-Ruby (from hollow ataraxia)
A magical girl form of Rin.

Reception
Fate/tiger colosseum was the 4th best-selling game during its week of release in Japan according to sources from the Media Create Weekly Ranking, selling 54,880 copies. It then rose to 3rd place with 64,530 copies sold. Its final sales figure was 68,677 units sold in Japan.

The game received scores of 70/70/70/60 from Dengeki and 25 out of 40 (7/6/6/6) from Famitsu.

References

2007 video games
Capcom games
Cavia (company) games
Fate/stay night video games
Fighting games
J.C.Staff
Japan-exclusive video games
PlayStation Portable games
PlayStation Portable-only games
Type-Moon
Video games based on anime and manga
Video games developed in Japan
Multiplayer and single-player video games